John Kelleher (September 13, 1893 – August 21, 1960) was a backup infielder in Major League Baseball, playing mainly at third baseman for four teams between the  and  seasons.
 
A native of Brookline, Massachusetts, Edwards was 18 years old when he entered the majors in 1912 with the St. Louis Cardinals, playing for them in part of that season before joining the Brooklyn Robins (1916), Chicago Cubs (1921–1923) and Boston Braves (1924). His most productive season came in 1921, when he hit .309 with 31 runs scored and 47 RBI in 95 games, all career-numbers. He enjoyed another good year in 1923, hitting .306 with a career-high six home runs.

In a six-season career, Kelleher was a .293 hitter (206-for-703) with 10 home runs and 89 RBI in 235 games, including 81 runs, 29 doubles, eight triples, and nine stolen bases. Following his playing career, he was an assistant baseball coach at Harvard University in 1925 and head coach at Brown University from 1930 to 1941.

Kelleher died in Brookline, Massachusetts, at the age of 66.

References

External links

1893 births
1960 deaths
Major League Baseball infielders
Boston Braves players
Brooklyn Robins players
Chicago Cubs players
St. Louis Cardinals players
Minor league baseball managers
Brown Bears baseball coaches
Denver Bears players
Indianapolis Indians players
Kansas City Blues (baseball) players
Springfield Reapers players
Sportspeople from Brookline, Massachusetts
St. Joseph Saints players
Baseball players from Massachusetts